Kuler Achaar is a 2022 Indian Bengali language film directed by Sudeep Das. The film is produced by Shrikant Mohta and Mahendra Soni under the banner of Shree Venkatesh Films. The film features Madhumita Sarcar, Vikram Chatterjee, Indrani Haldar and Sujan Mukhopadhyay in lead roles.

Cast 

 Madhumita Sarcar as Mithi 
 Vikram Chatterjee as Pritam, Mithi's husband 
 Indrani Haldar as Mitali, Pritam's mother 
 Sujan Mukhopadhyay as Pronotosh, Pritam's father

Release 
The film was released theatrically on 15 July 2022.

Soundtrack

References 

Bengali-language Indian films
2020s Bengali-language films